Camp Caribou is an American sleepaway summer camp located in Winslow, Maine, focusing on sports and numerous outdoor activities. The campers, aged 8 to 16 are able to participate in sports such as Basketball, Tennis, Baseball, Riflery/Archery, Swimming, Soccer, and many more sports and activities. Camp Caribou's program consists of two summer sessions, held as a session 1 and session 2 in 3.5-week sessions each summer. A camper may elect to attend for just the first or second session for only 3.5 weeks, or both sessions for a total of 7 weeks. The staff includes both domestic American as well as international counselors.

History 

Camp Caribou is located in Winslow, Maine on a 200-acre peninsula. Caribou was founded in 1922 by a Morris Waldman from the New York City area. The camp was not formally purchased by the Lerman family until the 1960s. The camp has since been under ownership and administration of Bill and Martha Lerman, and their now adult children, Bobby and Lori, for many years. Alex Rotman was a camper at Caribou, who since married Bill and Martha's daughter Lori. Rotman is a lead administrator and influence at Camp Caribou.

Camp Caribou has received accolades from numerous major publications, including: Newsweek, The New York Times, Boston magazine, and many others.

Camp program 

Each summer there are two 3.5-week sessions of the camp. Campers are able to choose between a session "A" or "B"—each being 3.5 weeks in length—and is a full sleepaway experience. Parents of campers may elect also to send their child for both sessions, totaling 7 weeks. In years past, the sessions were 4 weeks each, or 8 weeks total, but due to conflicts with summer and school start dates (mainly for the counselors that may be in college/university) the sessions were reduced by half a week each to their current 3.5 week term.

References 

1922 establishments in Maine
Winslow, Maine
Summer camps in Maine